{{family name hatnote|Rice (American patronymic surname), and her middle name is  Sobreo (Philippine matronymic surname)}}

Jacqueline Sobreo Rice (born April 27, 1990)  is a Filipino-American actress, singer, and model.

Career and personal life
Born to an American father and a Filipino mother, she grew up in Olongapo City, Zambales. She was a student at St. Anne Academy in Olongapo City when she entered showbusiness through GMA Network's reality search contest StarStruck, where she became the Ultimate Female Survivor in the show's third season. After StarStruck, she appeared in Love to Love and Fantastikids and then later starred in Fantastic Man. She later joined Dyesebel and then Ang Babaeng Hinugot sa Aking Tadyang. After that, she played Mercedita in Kung Aagawin Mo ang Lahat sa Akin.

She currently lives in Quezon City and is a contract artist of GMA Artist Center. She appeared as the cover girl of Maxim for the month of July 2009. As of late 2009, she played as one of the villains in Darna. In early 2010, she was also included in the fantaserye Panday Kids. She was then cast into lead roles via Dear Friend Presents: Tisay and Ilumina where she played a black sorcerer possessed by a demon. 
In 2017, she joined My Love from the Star wherein she replaces Bea Binene because Jennylyn Mercado's fans said the latter was too young for the role of Lucy.

In 2018, Jackie became famous again when she became the lead antagonist of Hindi Ko Kayang Iwan Ka as the insane Ava and also the heartless ex-girlfriend of Marco who died in the finale episode after attempting to kill Thea. She portrayed a character that is similar to Ryza Cenon's villain and femme fatale character in Ika-6 na Utos. Later in 2019, she was cast as the comical supporting villain in TODA One I Love as Tiffy who will become the rival of Jelay. Jackie Rice's antagonist role in that series is far from her previous character as she said, "Her Ava character in Hindi Ko Kayang Iwan Ka was very dark and cold-blooded murderer while in TODA One I Love'' is flirtatious and comical."

Filmography

Television drama

Drama anthology

Other shows

Movies

References

External links
 Jackie Rice on iGMA.tv
 
 Jackie Rice on Instagram

1990 births
Living people
21st-century Filipino actresses
Filipino child actresses
Filipino film actresses
Filipino people of American descent
Filipino television actresses
Tagalog people
Actresses from Bataan
People from Olongapo
Participants in Philippine reality television series
StarStruck (Philippine TV series) participants
StarStruck (Philippine TV series) winners
GMA Network personalities
American actresses of Filipino descent
Filipino female models
American female models
21st-century American actresses